Tui Shipston (born 19 September 1951) is a New Zealand former swimmer. She competed in four events at the 1968 Summer Olympics.

References

1951 births
Living people
New Zealand female swimmers
Olympic swimmers of New Zealand
Swimmers at the 1968 Summer Olympics
Swimmers from Christchurch
Swimmers at the 1966 British Empire and Commonwealth Games
Commonwealth Games competitors for New Zealand